The Faculty of Social Sciences at the University of Copenhagen is divided into five departments, where research and teaching are carried out in the fields of Economics, Political Science, International Politics, Management, Anthropology, Psychology and Sociology. The faculty prepares students for the Bachelor's degree (BA), the Master's degree, and the Ph.D. in the fields of Economics, Political Science, Anthropology, Sociology, Psychology and Social Studies.

References

University of Copenhagen